This is a list of the former municipalities of Finland.

Contents: A B C D E 
F G H I J K L M 
N O P Q R S T U
V W X Y Z Ä Ö


A 
Ahlainen (Vittisbofjärd) – became part of Pori in 1972
Aitolahti (Aitolax) – became part of Tampere in 1966
Akaa (Ackas) – was divided in 1946 between Toijala, Kylmäkoski, Sääksmäki and Viiala. The name was re-introduced in 2007 when the municipalities of Toijala and Viiala were consolidated.
Alahärmä – consolidated with Kauhava in 2009
Alastaro – consolidated with Loimaa in 2009
Alatornio (Nedertorneå) – became m par mt of Tornio in 1973
Alaveteli (Nedervetil) – consolidated with Kronoby in 1969
Angelniemi – became part of Halikko in 1967
Anjala – the municipalities of Anjala and Sippola were consolidated in 1975 to form the Anjalankoski market town
Antrea (S:t Andree) – was lost to the USSR in 1944
Anttola – became part of Mikkeli in 2001
Artjärvi (Artsjö) – consolidated with Orimattila in 2011
Askainen (Villnäs) – consolidated with Masku in 2009

B 
 Bergö – became part of Malax in 1975
 Björköby – became part of Korsholm in 1973
 Bromarf – consolidated mostly with Tenala (southern part with Hanko) in 1977

D 
 Degerby – consolidated with Ingå (fi. Inkoo) in 1946
 Dragsfjärd – consolidated with Kimito and Västanfjärd to form Kimitoön in 2009

E 
Ekenäs (fin. Tammisaari) – consolidated with Karis and Pohja (swe. Pojo) to form Raseborg in 2009
Ekenäs landskommun – consolidated with Ekenäs in 1977
Elimäki (Elimä)– consolidated with Kouvola in 2009
Eno – consolidated with Joensuu in 2009
Eräjärvi – became part of Orivesi in 1973
Esse – became part of Pedersöre in 1977
Etelä-Pirkkala (swe. Södra Birkkala) – name of Pirkkala (swe. Birkala) in 1922–1938

H 
Haaga (:fi:Haagan (kauppala) (swe. Haga köping) – became part of Helsinki (swe. Helsingfors) in 1946
Haapasaari – became part of Kotka in 1974
Halikko – consolidated with Salo in 2009
Harlu – was lost to the USSR in 1944
Hauho – consolidated with Hämeenlinna (swe. Tavastehus) in 2009
Haukivuori – became part of City of Mikkeli (swe. S:t Michel) in 2007
Heinjoki – was lost to the USSR in 1944
Heinolan maalaiskunta (swe. Heinola landskommun) and Heinola were consolidated as Heinola in 1997
Helsingin maalaiskunta (Helsinge landskommun)– renamed as Vantaa (swe. Vanda) in 1972, parts of the municipality had been annexed to Helsinki in 1946 with the exception of Vuosaari (swe. Nordsjö), which was annexed in 1966
Himanka (swe. Himango) – consolidated with Kalajoki in 2010
Hiitola – was lost to the USSR in 1944
Hinnerjoki – became part of Eura in 1970
Honkajoki – consolidated with Kankaanpää in 2021
Honkilahti (swe. Honkilax) – became part of Eura in 1970
Houtskär – consolidated with Iniö, Korpo, Nagu and Pargas to form Väståboland
Huopalahti (swe. Hoplax) – became part of Helsinki (swe. Helsingfors) in 1946
Hyvinkään maalaiskunta (Hyvinge landskommun)– became part of Hyvinkää (swe. Hyvinge) in 1969
Hämeenkoski – consolidated with Hollola in 2016
Hämeenlinnan maalaiskunta (Tavastehus landskommun) – was divided in 1948 between Hämeenlinna (swe. Tavastehus), Renko and Vanaja (swe. Vånå)

I 
Ikaalisten maalaiskunta – merged with the neighbouring market town of Ikaalinen in 1972, which became a city in 1977.
Impilahti (Imbilax) – was lost to the USSR in 1944, currently part of Pitkyaranta
Iniö – consolidated with Houtskär, Korpo, Nagu and Pargas to form Väståboland.  Renamed in 2011 to Pargas

J 
Jaakkima – was lost to the USSR in 1944
Jaala – consolidated with Kouvola in 2009
Jalasjärvi – consolidated with Kurikka in 2016
Jeppo – consolidated with Nykarleby in 1975
Johannes (finn. Johannes (Viipurin lääni) swe. S:t Johannes) – was lost to the USSR in 1944
Joutseno – consolidated with Lappeenranta (swe. Villmanstrand) in 2009
Juankoski – consolidated with Kuopio in 2017
Jurva – consolidated with Kurikka in 2009
Jyväskylän maalaiskunta (Jyväskylä landskommun) – consolidated with Jyväskylä in 2009
Jämsänkoski – consolidated with Jämsä in 2009
Jäppilä – became part of Pieksänmaa in 2004, along with Pieksämäen maalaiskunta and Virtasalmi
Jääski – was partially lost to the USSR in 1944, the rest of the municipality was incorporated into Imatra, Joutseno and Ruokolahti (swe. Ruokolax) in 1948

K 
Kaarlela (swe. Karleby) – became part of the City of Kokkola (swe. Karleby) in 1977
Kajaanin maalaiskunta (Kajana landskommun) – became part of the City of Kajaani (swe. Kajana) in 1977
Kakskerta – consolidated with Turku swe. Åbo) in 1968
Kalanti (swe. Kaland) (formerly known as Uusikirkko Tl (Nykyrka).) – became part of the City of Uusikaupunki (swe. Nystad) in 1993
Kalvola – consolidated with Hämeenlinna in 2009
Kangaslampi – became part of the City of Varkaus in 2005
Kanneljärvi – was lost to the USSR in 1944
Karhula – became part of the City of Kotka in 1977
Karinainen (Karinais) – was consolidated along with Pöytyä in 2005 to form the municipality of Pöytyä (swe.Pöytis) 
Karis – consolidated with Ekenäs and Pohja (swe. Pojo) to form Raseborg in 2009
Karis landskommun – consolidated with Karis in 1969
Karjala – became part of Mynämäki (swe. Virmo) in 1977
Karkku (formerly known as Sastamala) – became part of the City of Vammala in 1973
Karttula – consolidated with Kuopio in 2011
Karuna – became part of Sauvo (swe. Sagu) in 1969
Karunki (Karungi) – became part of the City of Tornio in 1973
Kaukola – was lost to the USSR in 1944
Kauvatsa – became part of Kokemäki in 1969
Keikyä – formed Äetsä along with Kiikka in 1981
Kemin maalaiskunta (Kemi landskommun) – renamed as Keminmaa in 1979
Kerimäki – consolidated with Savonlinna in 2013
Kestilä – consolidated with Piippola, Pulkkila and Rantsila to form Siikalatva in 2009
Kiihtelysvaara – became part of the City of Joensuu in 2005
Kiikala – consolidated with Salo in 2009
Kiikka – formed Äetsä along with Keikyä in 1981
Kimito – consolidated with Dragsfjärd and Västanfjärd to form Kimitoön in 2009
Kirvu – was lost to the USSR in 1944
Kisko – consolidated with Salo in 2009
Kiukainen (swe. Kiukais) – consolidated with Eura in 2009
Kivennapa (swe. Kivinebb) – was lost to the USSR in 1944
Kodisjoki – became part of City of Rauma (Swe. Raumo) in 2007
Koijärvi – was divided between Forssa and Urjala in 1969
Koivisto (swe. Björkö, Vl)– was lost to the USSR in 1944
Koiviston mlk (Björkö landskommun Vl)– was lost to the USSR in 1944
Konginkangas – became part of Äänekoski in 1993
Korpilahti (swe. Korpilax) – consolidated with Jyväskylä in 2009
Korpiselkä – was partially lost to the USSR in 1944, the rest was incorporated into Tuupovaara in 1946
Korpo – consolidated with Houtskär, Iniö, Nagu and Pargas to form Väståboland
Kortesjärvi – consolidated with Kauhava in 2009
Koskenpää – became part of Jämsänkoski in 1969
Koski Hl. – renamed as Hämeenkoski in 1995
Kuhmalahti (swe. Kuhmalax) – consolidated with Kangasala in 2011
Kuivaniemi – became part of Ii (swe. Ijo) in 2007
Kullaa – became part of Ulvila (swe. Ulvsby) in 2005
Kulosaari (swe. Brändö)– became part of Helsinki (swe. Helsingfors) in 1946
Kuolajärvi – renamed as Salla in 1936
Kuolemajärvi – was lost to the USSR in 1944
Kuopion maalaiskunta (Kuopio landskommun) – most of the municipality was incorporated into Kuopio and the rest into Siilinjärvi in 1969
Kuorevesi – became part of Jämsä in 2001
Kurkijoki (swe. Kronoborg)– was lost to the USSR in 1944
Kuru – consolidated with Ylöjärvi in 2009
Kuusankoski – consolidated with Kouvola in 2009
Kuusjoki – consolidated with Salo in 2009
Kuusjärvi – renamed as Outokummun kauppala in 1968
Kvevlax became part of Korsholm in 1973
Kylmäkoski – consolidated with Akaa (swe. Ackas) in 2011
Kymi (swe. Kymmene) – became part of the City of Kotka in 1977
Kyyrölä – became part of Muolaa in 1934
Käkisalmen mlk (swe. Kexholms landskommun) – was lost to the USSR in 1944
Käkisalmi (swe. Kexholm) – was lost to the USSR in 1944
Kälviä (swe. Kelviå) – consolidated with Kokkola (swe. Karleby) in 2009
Köyliö – consolidated with Säkylä in 2016

L 
Lahdenpohja – was lost to the USSR in 1944
Lammi – consolidated with Hämeenlinna (swe. Tavastehus) in 2009
Lappee – became part of the City of Lappeenranta (swe. Villmanstrand) in 1967
Lappi – consolidated with Rauma (swe. Raumo) in 2009
Lappfjärd – became part of the City of Kristinestad in 1973
Lauritsala – consolidated with Lappeenranta (swe. Villmanstrand) in 1967
Lavansaari (swe. Lövskär) – was lost to the USSR in 1944
Lavia - consolidated with Pori in 2015
Lehtimäki - consolidated with Alajärvi in 2009
Leivonmäki – became part of Joutsa in 2008
Lemu – consolidated with Masku in 2009
Liljendal – consolidated with Loviisa (swe. Lovisa) in 2010
Lohjan kunta (swe. Lojo kommun) and Lohja were consolidated to form Lohja (swe. Lojo) in 1997
Lohjan maalaiskunta (swe. Lojo landskommun)– renamed as Lohjan kunta (swe. Lojo kommun) in 1978
Lohtaja (swe. Lochteå) – consolidated with Kokkola (swe. Karleby) in 2009
Loimaan kunta (swe. Loimijoki) and Loimaa consolidated to form Loimaa in 2005
Loimaan maalaiskunta (Loimijoki landskommun) – renamed as Loimaan kunta in 1978
Lokalahti (Lokalax) – became part of the City of Uusikaupunki (swe. Nystad) in 1981
Lumivaara – was lost to the USSR in 1944
Luopioinen (Luopiois) – became part of Pälkäne in 2007
Luvia - merged with Eurajoki in 2017
Längelmäki – was divided in 2007 between Jämsä and Orivesi

M 
Maaninka – consolidated with Kuopio in 2015
Maaria (swe. S:t Marie) – became part of the City of Turku (swe. Åbo) in 1967
Maxmo (Maksamaa) – consolidated with Vörå to form Vörå-Maxmo in 2007
Mellilä – consolidated with Loimaa in 2009
Merimasku – consolidated with Naantali (swe. Nådendal, lat. Vallis Gratia) in 2009
Messukylä (swe. Messoby)– became part of the City of Tampere (swe. Tammerfors) in 1947
Metsämaa – became part of Loimaan kunta in 1976
Metsäpirtti – was lost to the USSR in 1944
Mietoinen (Mietois) – became part of Mynämäki in 2007
Mikkelin maalaiskunta (S:t Michels landskommun)– became part of the City of Mikkeli in 2001
Mouhijärvi – consolidated with Äetsä and Vammala to form Sastamala in 2009
Munsala – consolidated with Nykarleby in 1975
Muolaa – was lost to the USSR in 1944
Muurla – consolidated with Salo in 2009
Muuruvesi – became part of Juankoski in 1971
Mänttä – consolidated with Vilppula (Filpula) in 2009. At the same time, Vilppula was renamed as Mänttä-Vilppula (swe. Mänttä-Filpula).

N 
Naantalin maalaiskunta (Nådendals landskommun) – became part of the City of Naantali (swe. Nådendal) in 1964
Nagu – consolidated with Pargas, Houtskär, Iniö and Korpo to form a new city of Väståboland
Nastola – consolidated with Lahti in 2016
Nedervetil (Alaveteli) – consolidated with Kronoby in 1969
Noormarkku (swe. Norrmark) – consolidated with Pori (swe. Björneborg) in 2010
Nuijamaa – became part of the City of Lappeenranta (swe. Villmanstrand) in 1989
Nummi – was consolidated with Pusula to form Nummi-Pusula in 1981
Nurmeksen maalaiskunta (Nurmes landskommun) became part of the City of Nurmes in 1973
Nurmo – consolidated with Seinäjoki in 2009
Nykarleby landskommun – consolidated with 1975 with Nykarleby

O 
Oravais – consolidated with Vörå-Maxmo to form Vörå in 2011
Oulujoki (swe. Uleälv)– was divided in 1965. Most of it was consolidated with Oulu (swe. Uleåborg), and other parts with Haukipudas, Kempele, Kiiminki (swe. Kiminge), Oulunsalo (swe. Uleåsalo), Tyrnävä, Utajärvi and Ylikiiminki (swe. Överkiminge).
Oulunkylä (swe. Åggelby) – became part of the City of Helsinki (swe. Helsingfors) in 1946

P 
Paattinen (swe. Patis) – became part of the City of Turku (swe. Åbo) in 1973
Paavola – was consolidated with Revonlahti (swe. Revolax) to form Ruukki in 1973
Pargas landskommun – consolidated with Houtskär, Iniö, Nagu and Korpo to form Väståboland
Pattijoki – became part of the City of Raahe (swe. Brahestad) in 2003
Perniö (swe. Bjärnå) – consolidated with Salo in 2009
Pertteli (S:t Bertils) – consolidated with Salo in 2009
Peräseinäjoki and Seinäjoki consolidated to form the City of Seinäjoki in 2005
Pernå – consolidated with Loviisa in 2010
Petalax – consolidated with Malax in 1973
Petsamo – was lost to the USSR in 1944
Pieksämä – name of Pieksämäki in 1930–1948
Pieksämäen maalaiskunta (Pieksämäki landskommun) – consolidated with Jäppilä and Virtasalmi to form Pieksänmaa in 2004
Pieksänmaa – became part of City of Pieksämäki in 2007
Pielisensuu – became part of the City of Joensuu in 1954
Pielisjärvi – became part of Lieksa in 1973
Pietarsaaren maalaiskunta – Finnish name of Pedersöre until 1989
Pihlajavesi – became part of Keuruu in 1969
Piikkiö (Pikis)– consolidated with Kaarina in 2009
Piippola – consolidated with Kestilä, Pulkkila and Rantsila to form Siikalatva in 2009
Pohja (Pojo)– consolidated with Ekenäs and Karis to form Raseborg
Pohjaslahti – consolidated partly with Vilppula and partly with Virrat in 1973
Pohjois-Pirkkala – renamed as Nokia in 1938
Porin maalaiskunta (Björneborgs landskommun) – became part of the City of Pori in 1967
Pörtom – consolidated with Närpes in 1973
Porvoon maalaiskunta (Borgå landskommun) and Porvoo formed the new City of Porvoo in 1997
Pulkkila – consolidated with Kestilä, Piippola and Rantsila to form Siikalatva in 2009
Punkaharju – consolidated with Savonlinna in 2013
Purmo – consolidated with Pedersöre in 1977
Pusula – was merged with Nummi to form Nummi-Pusula in 1981
Pyhäjärvi Vpl – was lost to the USSR in 1944
Pyhäjärvi Ol – renamed as Pyhäsalmi in 1993 and again as Pyhäjärvi in 1996
Pyhäjärvi Ul – became part of Karkkila in 1969
Pyhämaa – became part of the City of Uusikaupunki in 1974
Pyhäsalmi – name of Pyhäjärvi in 1993–1996
Pyhäselkä – consolidated with Joensuu in 2009
Pylkönmäki – consolidated with Saarijärvi in 2009
Pälkjärvi – was partially lost to the USSR in 1944, the rest was incorporated into Tohmajärvi in 1946

R 
Räisälä – was lost to the USSR in 1944
Rantsila (Frantsila) – consolidated with Kestilä, Piippola and Pulkkila to form Siikalatva in 2009
Rauman maalaiskunta (Raumo landskommun) – became part of the City of Rauma in 1993
Rautio – became part of Kalajoki in 1973
Rautu – was lost to the USSR in 1944
Renko (Rengo) – consolidated with Hämeenlinna in 2009
Replot – became part of Korsholm in 1973
Revonlahti (Revonlax) – consolidated with Paavola to form Ruukki in 1973
Riistavesi – became part of the City of Kuopio in 1973
Ristiina – became part of City of Mikkeli (swe. S:t Michel) in 2013
Rovaniemen maalaiskunta (Roavniemi landskommun) – was consolidated with the City of Rovaniemi to form the City of Rovaniemi in 2006
Ruotsinpyhtää (Strömfors) – consolidated with Loviisa in 2010
Ruskeala – was lost to the USSR
Ruukki – became part of Siikajoki in 2007
Rymättylä (Rimito) – consolidated with Naantali in 2009

S 
Saari – consolidated with Parikkala and Uukuniemi to form Parikkala in 2005
Sahalahti (Sahalax) – became part of Kangasala in 2005
Säkkijärvi – was partially lost to the USSR in 1944, the rest was incorporated into Miehikkälä and Ylämaa in 1946
Sakkola – was lost to the USSR in 1944
Salmi – was lost to the USSR in 1944
Saloinen (Salois) (known as Salo until 1913) – became part of the City of Raahe (Brahestad) in 1973
Sammatti – consolidated with Lohja in 2009
Sastamala – the old name of Karkku. The name was re-introduced in 2009, when Äetsä, Mouhijärvi and Vammala were consolidated.
Savonranta – consolidated with Savonlinna in 2009
Säyneinen – became part of Juankoski in 1971
Seinäjoen maalaiskunta (Seinäjoki landskommun) – became part of Seinäjoki in 1959
Seiskari (Seitskär) – was lost to the USSR in 1944
Sideby – became part of the City of Kristinestad in 1973
Simpele – was partially lost to the USSR in 1944, the rest was incorporated into Rautjärvi in 1973
Sippola – was consolidated with Anjala to form Anjalankosken kauppala in 1975
Snappertuna – most of the municipality was incorporated into Ekenäs and the rest into Karis in 1977
Somerniemi (Sommarnäs) – became part of Somero in 1977
Soanlahti – was lost to the USSR in 1944
Solf – the part on the mainland became part of Korsholm in 1973
Sortavala (Sordavala) – was lost to the USSR in 1944 
Sortavalan mlk (Sordavala landskommun)– was lost to the USSR in 1944 
Suistamo – was lost to the USSR in 1944 
Sumiainen (Sumiais) – became part of City of Äänekoski together with Suolahti in 2007
Sundom – became part of the City of Vaasa in 1973
Suodenniemi – became part of City of Vammala in 2007
Suojärvi – was lost to the USSR in 1944
Suolahti – became part of City of Äänekoski together with Sumiainen in 2007
Suomenniemi – became part of City of Mikkeli (swe. S:t Michel) in 2013
Suomusjärvi – consolidated with Salo in 2009
Suoniemi – became part of the City of Nokia in 1973
Suursaari – was lost to the USSR in 1944
Särkisalo (Finby) – consolidated with Salo in 2009
Säräisniemi – a part of Utajärvi was annexed to Säräisniemi to form the municipality of Vaala in 1954
Säynätsalo – became part of the City of Jyväskylä in 1993
Sääksmäki – became part of Valkeakoski in 1973
Sääminki (Säminge) – most of the municipality was incorporated into Savonlinna and the rest into Punkaharju in 1973

T 
Tarvasjoki – consolidated with Lieto in 2015
Teisko – was divided between Tampere and Kuru in 1972
Temmes – became part of Tyrnävä in 2001
Tenala – became part of the City of Ekenäs in 1993
Terijoki – was lost to the USSR in 1944
Terjärv – consolidated with Kronoby in 1969
Toijala – consolidated with Viiala to form Akaa in 2007
Tottijärvi – became part of the City of Nokia in 1976
Turtola – renamed as Pello in 1949
Tuulos – consolidated with Hämeenlinna in 2009
Tuupovaara – became part of the City of Joensuu in 2005
Tyrvää (Tyrvis) – became part of Vammala in 1973, originally Vammala was separated from Tyrvää in 1915
Tyrväntö – became part of Hattula in 1971
Tytärsaari – was lost to the USSR in 1944
Töysä – consolidated with Alavus in 2013

U 
Ullava – consolidated with Kokkola in 2009
Uudenkaupungin maalaiskunta (Nystads landskommun)– became part of the City of Uusikaupunki in 1969
Uukuniemi – consolidated with Parikkala and Saari to form Parikkala in 2005
Uusikirkko (Nykyrka)– was lost to the USSR in 1944
Uusikirkko Tl (Nykyrka Åbo län)– renamed as Kalanti in 1936, became part of the City of Uusikaupunki in 1993
Uskela – became part of Salo in 1967

V 
Vahto – consolidated with Rusko in 2009
Vahviala – was partially lost to the USSR in 1944, the rest was incorporated into Lappee and Ylämaa in 1946
Valkjärvi – was lost to the USSR in 1944 
Valkeala – consolidated with Kouvola in 2009
Valtimo – consolidated with Nurmes in 2020
Vammala – consolidated with Äetsä and Mouhijärvi to form Sastamala in 2009
Vampula – consolidated with Huittinen in 2009
Vanaja (Vånå)– was divided between Hämeenlinna, Hattula, Janakkala and Renko in 1967
Varpaisjärvi – consolidated with Lapinlahti in 2011
Vehkalahti (Veckelax) – became part of the City of Hamina in 2003
Vehmersalmi – became part of the City of Kuopio in 2005
Velkua – consolidated with Naantali in 2009
Viiala – consolidated with Toijala to form Akaa in 2007
Viipuri (Swedish: Viborg) – was lost to the USSR in 1944
Viipurin maalaiskunta (Viborgs landskommun)– was lost to the USSR in 1944 
Viljakkala – became part of City of Ylöjärvi in 2007
Vilppula (Filpula)– consolidated with Mänttä to form Mänttä-Vilppula in 2009
Virtasalmi – consolidated with Pieksämäen maalaiskunta and Jäppilä to form Pieksänmaa
Vörå (Vöyri) – consolidated with Maxmo to form Vörå-Maxmo in 2007
Vörå-Maxmo – consolidated with Oravais to form (new) Vörå in 2011
Vuoksela – was lost to the USSR in 1944
Vuoksenranta – was lost to the USSR in 1944
Vuolijoki – became part of the City of Kajaani in 2007
Värtsilä – was partially lost to the USSR in 1944, consolidated with Tohmajärvi to form Tohmajärvi in 2005
Västanfjärd – consolidated with Dragsfjärd and Kimito to form Kimitoön in 2009

Y 
Ylämaa – consolidated with Lappeenranta in 2010
Ylihärmä – consolidated with Kauhava in 2009
Ylikiiminki (Överkiminge)– consolidated with Oulu in 2009
Ylistaro – consolidated with Seinäjoki in 2009
Yläne – consolidated with Pöytyä in 2009

Ä 
Äetsä – consolidated with Mouhijärvi and Vammala to form Sastamala in 2009
Äyräpää – was lost to the USSR in 1944
Äänekosken maalaiskunta (Äänekoski landskommun)– consolidated with Äänekoski in 1969

Ö 
Öja – became part of Kaarlela in 1969
Övermark – consolidated with Närpes in 1973

See also 
Former municipalities of Norway
Viipuri province

External links 

 
 
History of Karelia
Former municipalities